Baldina Di Vittorio (16 October 1920 – 2 January 2015) was an Italian politician.

Biography
Born Balda Di Vittorio in Cerignola, Province of Foggia, the daughter of the syndicalist trade unionist Giuseppe, Di Vittorio was registered in the Communist Party since 1938. At the outbreak of the Second World War she was interned in the Rieucros camp in the Lozère department, and after the collapse of France she  took refuge in the United States with her husband. In  New York Di Vittorio enrolled the courses of Jefferson School of Social Science and joined several anti-fascist groups.

Returned to Italy after the  war, she became a member of the national presidency of the feminist association Unione Donne in Italia (Union Women in Italy, also known as Udi). In April 1963 Di Vittorio was elected deputy for the Communist Party, and in 1968 she became a senator.

References 

1920 births
2015 deaths
20th-century Italian politicians
People from Cerignola
Members of the Senate of the Republic (Italy)
Italian Communist Party politicians
Italian socialist feminists